Plovanija  is a village in Croatia, near the border with Slovenia. It is connected by the D200 highway.

Populated places in Istria County